North Creswick railway station was a small junction station on the Mildura railway line where the Ballarat to Daylesford railway line branched to the northeast. Nothing remains of the station. It was 176.407 km from the start of the main line.

References

Disused railway stations in Victoria (Australia)